Acroterius is a genus of east Asian sheet weavers. It was first described by M. Irfan, S. Bashir and X. J. Peng in 2021, and it has only been found in China.

Species
 it contains twelve species:
A. absentus Irfan, Bashir & Peng, 2021 – China
A. brevis Irfan, Bashir & Peng, 2021 (type) – China
A. camur Irfan, Bashir & Peng, 2021 – China
A. circinatus Irfan, Bashir & Peng, 2021 – China
A. hamatus Irfan, Bashir & Peng, 2021 – China
A. inversus Irfan, Bashir & Peng, 2021 – China
A. latus Irfan, Bashir & Peng, 2021 – China
A. longidentatus Irfan, Bashir & Peng, 2021 – China
A. longimultus Irfan, Bashir & Peng, 2021 – China
A. longiprojectus Irfan, Bashir & Peng, 2021 – China
A. ovatus Irfan, Bashir & Peng, 2021 – China
A. parvus Irfan, Bashir & Peng, 2021 – China

See also
 List of Linyphiidae species (A–H)

References

Linyphiidae genera
Spiders of China